Washington is a city in Tazewell County, Illinois, United States. Washington is on U.S. Route 24 and Illinois Route 8, northeast of East Peoria. The population was 15,134 at the 2010 census, a 39.6 percent increase over 2000. It is a suburb of Peoria and is part of the Peoria Metropolitan Statistical Area.

History

Washington was founded in 1825 by William Holland Sr., who came from North Carolina and was hired by the U.S. government to provide blacksmith services to the local Native Americans. During his long and eventful life he was married three times, and was the father of twenty-one children: fourteen by his first wife and seven by his second wife. He had eighty-two grandchildren and fifty great grandchildren. He died in Washington on November 27, 1871, at the age of ninety-one. The post office (and later the city) was originally named Holland's Grove in 1833 before being renamed in honor of the first U.S. president, George Washington, in 1837.

In the 1920s, a man named George Heyl put Washington on the map as the home of the famous Heyl Pony Farm. Some of the original barns still exist on North Main Street. The Heyl Pony Farm supplied Shetland ponies to buyers around the world; George Heyl also raised pure bred poultry. When Heyl died suddenly in 1932, it was recorded as one of the largest funerals ever held in Washington.

Another local site of interest is the "old canning factory", which is now occupied by American Allied Railway Equipment Company Inc. In 1943, the canning factory (which after the war was run by the Libby's company) had a shortage of workers, and the government needed K rations and canned goods to feed the troops. So 50 captured German soldiers from the prisoner of war camp known as Camp Ellis in Fulton County were brought in. The Washington sub-camp was first commanded by Colonel John S. Sullivan, and later by Captain T. A. Cox. The POWs were brought in on the old rail line that ran down Wood Street (the foundation of a sentry tower can be seen just northeast of the intersection of Wood and Jefferson near the entrance to the bike trail). They were trucked from the camp to various local farms to help with the pumpkin harvest. The prisoners were allowed no visitors, nor could residents speak to the prisoners. An exception was made for local ministers, such as Pastor Kammeyer from St. Mark's Lutheran who spoke fluent German and ministered to the POWs spiritual needs. Once a POW jumped from a truck going down South Main Street and was almost shot before the guard realized he was just trying to retrieve his hat which had blown off.

Years later when the Libby plant burned, they found a U.S. Army rifle issued to a soldier who was a guard. It was reported missing, and suspected hidden by a prisoner. 

A new community center, named Five Points Washington, opened in October 2007. The facility houses the Washington Public Library, a performing arts center, swimming pools, fitness center, and banquet center.

A new assisted living center for seniors was opened in early 2008, across the street from the Washington Christian Village.

2013 tornado

An EF4 tornado, part of the tornado outbreak of November 17, 2013, entered Washington from the southwest in East Peoria. Three people were killed, one during the storm and two others later from injuries, including a United States Army veteran. The tornado then destroyed the Georgetown Common apartment complex, including ripping second floors off most of the 17 apartment buildings. Hundreds of homes were destroyed as the tornado moved through town before finally exiting on the north side.

Geography
Washington is located at  (40.7035, -89.4066).

Climate
Washington has a humid continental climate (Köppen Dfa), with cold, snowy winters, and hot, humid summers. Monthly daily mean temperatures range from 22.5 °F (−5.3 °C) to 75.2 °F (24.0 °C). Snowfall is common in the winter, averaging 26.3 inches (67 cm), but this figure varies considerably for different years. Precipitation, averaging at 36 inches (914 mm), peaks in the spring and summer, and is the least in winter. Extremes have ranged from −27 °F (−33 °C) in January 1884 to 113 °F (45 °C) in July 1936.

Schools
District 308 is Washington Community High School and has 1359 students in attendance as of August 2017. District 308 contains three elementary public school districts: District 50 (John L. Hensey and Beverly Manor), 51 (Central), and 52 (which consists of Lincoln Grade and Washington Middle school), as well as St. Patrick's School, which is private and Catholic.

Transportation
U.S. Route 24 runs east–west outside of Washington. Business U.S. 24 runs through the downtown square of Washington.

Government
Washington uses a council–manager form of government with an appointed city administrator, acting as the chief administrative officer and managing day-to-day operations, and an elected mayor. As of February 2020, the current city administrator is Ray Forsythe and the current mayor is Gary W. Manier.

Demographics

As of the census of 2000, there were 10,841 people, 4,189 households, and 3,091 families residing in the city. The racial makeup of the city was 98.36% White, 0.26% African American, 0.08% Native American, 0.42% Asian, 0.26% from other races, and 0.62% from two or more races. Hispanic or Latino of any race were 0.67% of the population.

There were 4,189 households, out of which 35.3% had children under the age of 18 living with them, 63.8% were married couples living together, 7.7% had a female householder with no husband present, and 26.2% were non-families. 22.5% of all households were made up of individuals, and 8.5% had someone living alone who was 65 years of age or older. The average household size was 2.56 and the average family size was 3.02.

In the city, the population was spread out, with 26.0% under the age of 18, 7.9% from 18 to 24, 29.7% from 25 to 44, 23.3% from 45 to 64, and 13.0% who were 65 years of age or older. The median age was 37 years. For every 100 females, there were 95.3 males. For every 100 females age 18 and over, there were 90.5 males.

The median income for a household in the city was $71,702, and the median income for a family was $61,184. Males had a median income of $64,388 versus $43,460 for females. The per capita income for the city was $24,231. About 2.8% of families and 4.1% of the population were below the poverty line, including 4.5% of those under age 18 and 3.5% of those age 65 or over.

Employment
, 66.8% of people aged 16 and over were employed in the civilian labor force, 2.8% were "unemployed" in the civilian work force, 0.1% were in the armed forces, and 30.3% were not in the labor force. Average travel time to work for Washington residents was 21.5 min.

The Washington Chamber of Commerce lists the following information about employers:

Employment by occupation category

Employers - Manufacturers and distributor

Employers - Retailers

Employers - Services and institutions

Education
Beverly Manor Middle School (District 50)
Central Primary School (District 51)
Central Intermediate School (District 51)
John L. Hensey Elementary School (District 50)
Lincoln Grade School (District 52)
Washington Middle School (District 52)
Washington Community High School District 308
St. Patrick School (Roman Catholic Diocese of Peoria)
Tazewell County has a joint special education service, the Tazewell-Mason Counties Special Education Association (TMCSEA).

Annual events
9-11 Memorial Walk
Good Neighbor Days, previously called the Cherry Festival
Memorial Day Parade
Take Pride in Washington Day
Veterans Day Parade
Washington Fine Arts Festival

Notable people 
Mark Dennis, offensive tackle for the Miami Dolphins, Cincinnati Bengals and the Carolina Panthers; alumnus of Washington High School; member of the Greater Peoria Sports Hall of Fame
Doug Lee, shooting guard and small forward with the Houston Rockets, New Jersey Nets, and Sacramento Kings; grew up in Washington; member of the IBCA and Greater Peoria Sports Hall of Fame
Alec Peters, basketball player, second-round selection in 2017 NBA draft; born in Washington
Colton Underwood, former NFL player and star of ABC's The Bachelor, attended Washington Community High School
Fred Taral, Hall of Fame jockey and trainer, raised in Washington until he was 14.

See also
Ronald Reagan Trail

References

External links
City of Washington
Washington Chamber of Commerce
Washington Park District
Washington District Library
Washington Historical Society
Washington Rewind

Cities in Tazewell County, Illinois
Cities in Illinois
Ronald Reagan Trail
Peoria metropolitan area, Illinois
Populated places established in 1834
1834 establishments in Illinois